Christopher 'Pere' Ajuwa (23 November 1941 – 31 January 2017) was the first man from the Niger Delta region of Nigeria to run for the office of the President of Nigeria. He was an astute businessman during the 1980s and 1990s, and was best known for his humanitarian benefactions.

Overview 
Christopher 'Pere' Ajuwa was born in the state of Bayelsa, located in South Nigeria, in the Niger Delta regions.  He was a successful businessman, philanthropist, and politician. In the late 80s, Pere was the first Niger Deltan in Nigerian modern national history to dare the dangerous political waters of the country of Nigeria. He campaigned and advocated fearlessly across the length and breadth of Nigeria advocating for the need of his region's people, the Ijaws. He felt the people are from the  Niger Delta region, which produces a sizable amount of revenue that sustains the well-being of the Nigerian state, should greater say and benefit fairly from the vast resources their region provide.

Chief Pere Ajuwa supported every genuine effort of the Ijaw people to be properly recognized and be accorded their pride of place politically, economically, and in other areas of human endeavour by using his personal resources to fight for the political and economic emancipation of the minorities of the South-South, especially his tribesmen and women, who had suffered years of neglect and deprivation from the activities of oil companies.

Eventually, in 1993 Pere entered the presidential primaries against Alhaji Bashir Tofa under the party platform of National Republican Convention (NRC). Subsequently, in 2003 and 2007, he ran for president of Nigeria against President Muhammadu Buhari (2015-2019) under the party platform of All Nigeria People Party (ANPP). Though Pere did not win either of the elections, his zeal and dogmatic spirit did pave way for many young politicians from the Niger Delta to aspire for the office the President of Nigeria. He was a man of affluence, and a benefactor to many souls from the Niger Delta and beyond. Throughout his life, Pere stuck to the tradition and culture of his Izon kinsmen. Chief Dr. Christopher Pere Ajuwa died in 2017 in Port Harcourt at the age of 76.

Family and childhood

Early years 
Christopher Pere Ajuwa was born on 23 November 1941 to the families of High Chief Pa Ogongolo Vurudu Ajuwa of the Egbesubiri Quarter, and Chief Ma Mrs. Rachael Diriayefa Ajuwa  and Erubiri Quarter of Gbaranraun kingdom, in Local Government Area of Southern Ijaw located in the State of Bayelsa. The Gbaranraun Kingdom is one of the prominent Kingdoms among the Ijaw people in the Niger Delta, South Nigeria and is a major contributor to the economy of the nation.

Pere's birth is considered by locals a sign of a miracle and was spoken of as though shrouded by mystery. It was reported, that Pere's mother fell into maternity labour while fishing, and in the absence of a midwife she gave birth to him in her canoe. Accordingly, that fateful day Rachael Diriayefa Ajuwa caught her biggest fish ever and she called her newborn son ‘Pere’ which is literally translated to mean “Wealth” in English.

Education 
Pere attended Ade Oshodi, a primary school in Western-Nigeria, from 1954 to 1960 and earned his First School Leaving Certificate. From 1961 to 1964, he proceeded to Stella Maris College, Okitipupa, in Ondo Local Government Area of Ondo State. Unfortunately, due to lack of funds, Pere was not able to complete his schooling at Stella Maris College probably. His quest for learning did not stop,  he found means to attended Government College Technical College Ijebu-Ode, Yaba Trade Centre, Lagos and he earned his City and Guide Intermediate in 1968. He then left Nigeria and to attend Yaba Technical College at University of Glasgow, Scotland where he earned his Advanced Technological Certificates in 1975.

Afterwards, in the late 1970s, Pere was at Worcester University, the United Kingdom studying Structural Engineering and other engineering courses and he became British certified Technical Structural Engineer in early 1980.

Then in 2006, Pere went a step further and earned a master's degree in Business Administration at the Ekiti State University.

Athletics and sports 
During his school years, Pere was considered a sensational soccer athlete. In the early 1970s he  played for Western State Corporation Football Club and Research Institute of Nigeria Football Club all in Ibadan Western Nigeria. Pere was referred to as a must-watch-player on the soccer fieldcan considered a great player. He went on to win laurels with those clubs. Throughout life, he continued to enjoy an active life of tennis, swimming and boat-racing.

Marriage and children 
Prior to getting married, Pere was a man many parts. He fathered seven children out of wedlock.

However, in 1972, while attending Yaba Technical College, Pere met Helen Kemi Olayiwola, a daughter of Akandi Olayiwola, from Ibadan. They married in 1974.
He fathered thirteen children with Helen Kemi Olayiwola and was happily married with Helen to his death.

As a father, he was manifestly strong disciplinarian and he imbibed in his children the tenants of hard work and obedience to constituted authority.

Faith 
As a child, Pere was christened in the Catholic Church. He later converted to the Pentecostal faith and became a member of Christ Apostolic Church. In the early 1980s he attended the Deeper Life Bible Church at Rumuodara town, Rivers State. Then in the early 1990s, he became a foundation member of the Redemption Ministries and worshiped there until his death.

Pere considered acts of philanthropy to be in accordance with his Christian faith. Pere was devoted to and loved offering praise and worship.

Death 
In the fall of 2016 Pere took ill and went into hospital. He was diagnosed with late end stage prostate cancer. He returned to his home but withdrew from the public and public functions. He died on Monday, 31 January 2017 at his residence in Port Harcourt. His last words were “Jesus have mercy on me”. He past in his sleep from complication due to Prostate cancer.

Governor Seriake Henry Dickson described Pere's death as sad, shocking and a monumental loss to the Government and people of Bayelsa State. Speaking at a funeral service held at the Chief DSP Alamieyeseigha Banquet Hall in Yenagoa, in honour of the deceased, Dickson remarked that Pere's contributions to the socio-economic and political growth of Bayelsa state and Nigeria will be forever remembered. For Pere's numerous and outstanding contributions, the governor announced the renaming of the popular Azikoro road after him which he said has become the culture of his administration to honour every true son and daughter of the state who made significant impression in various areas.

In thanks, Pere's first daughter and the state commissioner for Tourism, Development, and Mrs Ebiere Irene Ajuwa-Musa thanked Governor Dickson and people of the state for their notable roles they played in honoring her father.

The funeral service attracted flurry of politicians, traditional rulers, captains of industry, opinion leaders, women and youths from within and outside the state. People lined the streets in grief and to offer their condolences to the family.

Since his death, people refer to his time alive as "the Pere Ajuwa days".

The late Chief Pere Ajuwa was laid to rest 4 February 2017 at his home in the Ayibawari Villa chapel.

Career

Early career 
In 1969, Pere was first employed as a Technician with the Western State Water Corporation Ibadan. Then he abruptly left Western State Water Corporation and joined Cocoa Research Institute of Nigeria also in Ibadan (CRIN) as a competent Engineer in charge of the institute's Water Treatment Plant in 1970; he worked for two years. Pere later called it quit at Cocoa Research Institute of Nigeria for his educational advancement at University of Glasgow in the United Kingdom in the late 1970s.

Returning to Nigeria, Pere became Principal Consulting Engineer, SP Group Engineers in 1977.

He veered into private business as a Building Contractor and Petroleum Marketing in the early 1980s. He went on to become Chief Civil Engineer with Prefab Overseas Limited. In 1993, he helped found and run Pere Roberto Nigeria Limited as Company Secretary and then managing director. During this time, he executed some landmark projects which include construction of the Helipad in Bonny Camp, Victoria Island, Lagos and some structures in the Petroleum Training Institute in Warri (now Petroleum University) and many other projects in the Niger Delta.

Political life 
In 1986, Pere made a triumph entry into Port Harcourt city and ran and won the President of the Port Harcourt Chamber of Commerce and Industries. He brought some laudable innovations into the association. Under his leadership that the first Port Harcourt International Trade Fair was organized. Pere's success in business did not overshadow his love for Nigeria and his burning desire to ameliorate the sufferings of the oppressed and marginalized people of the Niger Delta.

After a successful outing as President of the Port Harcourt Chamber of Commerce and Industries in the late 1980s; he launched himself into the political landscape of Nigeria when the opportunity came to fashion a new Constitution for the Federal Republic of Nigeria to herald the end of Military rule.

However, in 1989 he contested and won the Yenagoa Federal Constituency seat into the then constituent assembly. Pere strongly articulated positions such as minority rights, abrogation of the land use act, and resource control.

Pere's escapades in the constituent assembly of 1989 endeared him to the hearts of political bigwigs in the country and when political parties were formed, he became a founding member of Nigeria National Convention (NNC). At the time, one of the notable personality that sharpened young Pere's political reflexes in the murky political terrain was Chief Gina Yeseibo.

In 1992, there was restructuring of the political formations in Nigeria that eventually gave birth to the National Republican Convention (NRC) and the Social Democratic Party (SDP). Pere eventually became a founding member of the NRC and supported Chief Rufus Ada George to emerge as the Governor (January 1992 to November 1993) of old Rivers State.
 
After a successful outing as President of the Port Harcourt Chamber of Commerce and Industries in the late 1980s; he launched himself into the political landscape of Nigeria when the opportunity came to fashion a new Constitution for the Federal Republic of Nigeria to herald the end of Military rule.

Chief Pere Ajuwa was an epitome of doggedness and resilience in fighting for justice. Pere became the very first Niger Delta minority leader that dared the political intrigues of the majority ethnic group in the country.

His aspiration to run as a candidate for the presidential seat came to light in 1992 when National Republican Convention held their Presidential Primary election in the National Convention at Port Harcourt. Pere was a presidential aspirant on the platform of the defunct National Republican Convention (NRC), in the botched former President Ibrahim Babangida transition programme had also contested the position of Rivers state governor before the creation of Bayelsa state. Pere was forced to step down for Alhaji Bashiru Torfa who later became the flag Bearer of NRC with Social Democratic Party -SDP presidential candidate Alhaji MKO Abiola ran in the June 12, 1993 Presidential election that was cancelled.

On March 27, 1993, was the national convention date for the presidential race. The NRC announced Port Harcourt, Pere's home city, as the venue of the convention with over five thousand delegates for each of the Conventions. Pere took on a significant role in the convention, and paid the greater part of the bill for the Port Harcourt Convention.

The Port Harcourt convention was attended by prominent leaders of the party including Alhaji Bamanga Tukur, Alhaji Ibrahim Mantu and Alhaji Ibrahim Shinkafi. At the convention, Alhaji Ahmed Kusamotu defeated Senator Lawrence Adekunle Agunbiade alias LAKO to emerge as the chairman of the party. Senator Agunbiade was from Ise in the present Ekiti state while Dr. Kusamotu was from the royal family in Ikirun in the present Osun state.

In 1994 began a new crusade to arouse the consciousness of the Izon nation to embrace the unity of purpose in the pursuit of our common goals and aspirations. Today, the Izon nation in particular and the entire Niger Delta region are better for it. Under the auspices of Ijaw National Congress (INC) and Ijaw Youth Council (IYC worldwide), he became unstoppable as his political appetite grew daily.

The political call came again in 1998 and Pere became a founding member of the All People Party (APP) which late metamorphosed into All Nigerian Peoples Party (ANPP).

Years later, his presidential ambition rekindled and he ran in the primaries against current president Mohammadu Buhari and lost in 2003 and 2007 respectively. He ran as presidential candidate in presidential election in 2003  and 2007  on the party platform of Liberal Democratic Party of Nigeria (LDPN) and Alliance for Democracy (AD) respectively.

In 2003 when it was clear that the APP which has transformed into the ANPP, he was forced to step down in the All Nigeria Peoples Party (ANPP) when General Mohammadu Buhari, who was picked as the presidential candidate, causing Pere to leave the party. Since the ANPP would not give him the Presidential ticket, he switched sides to the Liberal Democratic Party of Nigeria ( LDPN and emerged its presidential candidate in 2003.

In the buildup to the 2007 election, he went back to the ANPP and was forced to step down for General Mohammadu Buhari. He was later adopted by the Alliance for Democracy as its presidential candidate after the sudden death of the then Presidential candidate, Chief Adebayo Adefarati.

In 2011, he contested to fill the Bayelsa Central Senatorial seat on the platform of ANPP and lost to the ruling PDP candidate.

Mentor 
All during his career, Pere was known as a mentor to many. In a tributes, former lawmakers in the senate, John Brambaifa, Inatimi Rufus-Spiff, Speaker of the State Assembly, Rt. Hon. Konbowei Benson and the Chief of Staff Government House, Rt. Hon. Talford Ongolo all eulogized the late Chief Ajuwa, making reference to him as a mentor.

Activist 
A foremost industrialist who was one of the few millionaires from Ijaw descent, Ajuwa fought the Shell Petroleum Development Company ( SDPC) demanding for improved life for the people of oil bearing communities.

His struggle came to head in 2006 when Ajuwa led 145 Ijaw communities under the aegis of Ijaw Aborigines and dragged Shell before a joint session of the National Assembly. The National Assembly awarded the communities US$1.5 billion damages as compensation for environmental degradations caused by the company since it began oil exploration in 1956.

Awards and honours 
In April 1995, in recognition of his untiring efforts in educational development, the University of Calabar awarded him an Honorary Doctor of Science (D.Sc.) Degree (Honoris causa) in Business Management.

His philanthropic wavelength cut across ethnic boundaries when the people of Enugu Uku rolled out their festive drums in celebration when they conferred on him the IKEMBA OF ENUGU UKU.

Pere brought tremendous educational and community development to Gbanraun hence the paramount ruler in council, King E.G Ojogbo and all relevant stakeholders conferred on him one of the highest chieftaincy titles in the kingdom; Egbesu XVI of Egbesubiri in 1986.

Posthumous honours include Governor Seriake Henry Dickson of Bayelsa State honouring Pere by renaming a major road after him.

References 

1941 births
2017 deaths
Alumni of the University of Glasgow
Alumni of the University of Worcester
Ekiti State University alumni
Nigerian businesspeople
Nigerian engineers
Nigerian politicians